Angela Candace Santomero, also known as Angela Santomero (born April 26, 1968), is an American television executive producer and co-creator of the long-running Nickelodeon children's television programs Blue's Clues, its spin-off Blue's Room, and its reboot Blue's Clues & You!, as well as the PBS children's shows Super Why!, Daniel Tiger's Neighborhood, & Rosie's Rules the Amazon Studios series Creative Galaxy, Wishenpoof!, and the Netflix original series Charlie's Colorforms City. Santomero has won a Peabody Award, a 2012 Emmy Award for Daniel Tiger's Neighborhood, two Television Critics Association Awards, and the 2018 World Screen's Kids Trendsetter Award. She has been nominated for more than twenty-five Emmy Awards and numerous Parents' Choice Gold and Silver Awards.

Early life and education 
Santomero grew up in Harrington Park, New Jersey, where she attended Harrington Park Public School before attending and graduating from Northern Valley Regional High School at Old Tappan in 1986. She received her bachelor's degree from Catholic University, which later presented her with their Young Alumni Merit Award.  She earned a master's degree in child development and psychology, with a specialty in instructional technology and media, from Columbia University. During graduate school, she was influenced by the research of Daniel R. Anderson, who studied the effects of television violence on children and later served as a researcher and consultant for Blue's Clues, and "became fascinated with the idea that if television could have a powerful negative effect on kids, it could have an equally powerful positive effect on them..."  She was also influenced by Fred Rogers, host of Mister Rogers' Neighborhood and the researchers of Sesame Street.

Career 
Santomero worked as a researcher for  Nickelodeon in the early 1990s, when the network was looking to create a new television show for preschoolers. In 1994, Santomero, along with director Todd Kessler and animator Traci Paige Johnson (a group that Nickelodeon executive Brown Johnson called a "green creative team"), created the "landmark" series Blue's Clues. According to writer Diane Tracy, Santomero, Kessler, and Johnson did not possess traditional backgrounds of most producers of children's programs, but "did possess an amazing combination of talents, backgrounds, and personal attributes."  Santomero served as executive producer and head writer, and designed the show's research and curriculum. She produced and developed other Blue's Clues projects, such as the full-length movie Blue's Big Musical Movie, educational CDs and books based on the show, two Blue's Clues theatrical productions, which toured across the U.S., and the reboot Blue's Clues & You!. She was also the founder of a company called Out of the Blue Enterprises which later was renamed to 9 Story USA. In 2007, Santomero created the PBS program Super Why!; she also served as executive producer and head writer.

In 2011, she became host of PBS's The Parent Show, an online series about parenting. In September 2012, Daniel Tiger's Neighborhood, for which Santomero is creator, executive producer and head writer, debuted on PBS. After Fred died in 2003, "Kevin Morrison (CEO-Fred Rogers Co.) reached out to Angela and asked what show she would do to honor Fred's legacy". Her idea was an animated version of Fred Rogers' Neighborhood of Make Believe. This was the birth of Daniel Tiger's Neighborhood.

She is also the creator and producer of the Amazon original series Creative Galaxy and Wishenpoof!, and the Netflix series Charlie's Colorforms City. Angela authored Preschool Clues - Raising Smart, Inspired and Engaged Kids in a Screen-Filled World (Touchstone 2018) with co-author Deborah Reber, and authored Radical Kindness - The Life-Changing Power of Giving and Receiving (HarperCollins Publishers 2019) with foreword by Deepak Chopra.

Personal life 
Santomero resides in Greenwich, Connecticut, with her husband Greg, an Emmy Award-winning designer/creative director, and their two daughters.

References

Works cited
 Tracy, Diane. (2002). Blue's Clues for Success: The 8 Secrets Behind a Phenomenal Business. New York: Kaplan Publishing. .

External links
 
 

1968 births
Living people
PBS people
Catholic University of America alumni
Teachers College, Columbia University alumni
Nickelodeon Animation Studio people
American women television producers
American people of Italian descent
Businesspeople from Greenwich, Connecticut
Northern Valley Regional High School at Old Tappan alumni
People from Harrington Park, New Jersey
Connecticut Democrats
Television producers from New Jersey
21st-century American women